Ketsia is a Haitian-Canadian singer and songwriter, born in Montreal, Quebec. She is an Indie artist, singing in French and English, and co-founder of the Canadian record label K-train Entertainment.

Career 
Ketsia has 3 songs which made it to the Billboard charts, spending a total of 15 weeks on the charts. "Possible" was the first song to hit the charts in June 2010, then came "Just Let Me Go" in March 2011, and the last song to appear on a chart was "Running on Empty" in June 2011. "Possible" charted for 4 weeks and peaked at No. 83 on Billboard Magazine's "Hot 100" chart and No. 9 on Billboard Magazine's "Emerging Canadian Artists" chart. "Just Let Me Go" charted for 7 weeks and peaked at No. 49 on Billboard Magazine's "Hot 100" chart and No. 4 on Billboard Magazine's "Emerging Canadian Artists" chart. "Running on Empty" peaked at No. 45 on Billboard Magazine's "Hot 100" chart; No. 4 on Billboard Magazine's "Emerging Canadian Artists" chart; and No. 18 on Billboard Magazine's "Hot Digital Songs" chart (June 2011). Ketsia was on the centerfold of ME Magazine’s summer 2010 issue as part of the magazine’s "Rising Star" series. Using sales data from Nielsen SoundScan Inc, the Quebec Government ranked Ketsia as having the 15th most sold Québécois digital track in 2010, for her song "Possible".

References 

Year of birth missing (living people)
Living people
Singers from Montreal
Canadian people of Haitian descent
Haitian Quebecers
21st-century Black Canadian women singers
Ketsia